The 2015 World Mixed Curling Championship was held from September 12 to 19 at the Curling Bahn Allmend in Bern, Switzerland.

Teams

Group A

Group B

Group C

Group D

Round robin standings
Final Round Robin Standings

Round robin results
All draw times are listed in Central European Summer Time (UTC+2).

Group A

Saturday, September 12
Draw 1
8:00

Draw 3
16:00

Sunday, September 13
Draw 5
8:00

Draw 7
16:00

Monday, September 14
Draw 9
8:00

Draw 11
16:00

Tuesday, September 15
Draw 14
12:00

Draw 16
20:00

Wednesday, September 16
Draw 18
12:00

Draw 20
20:00

Thursday, September 17
Draw 22
12:00

Draw 24
20:00

Group B

Saturday, September 12
Draw 2
12:00

Draw 4
20:30

Sunday, September 13
Draw 6
12:00

Draw 8
20:00

Monday, September 14
Draw 9
8:00

Draw 11
16:00

Tuesday, September 15
Draw 13
8:00

Draw 15
16:00

Wednesday, September 16
Draw 17
8:00

Draw 19
16:00

Thursday, September 17
Draw 21
8:00

Draw 23
16:00

Group C

Saturday, September 12
Draw 1
8:00

Draw 3
16:00

Sunday, September 13
Draw 5
8:00

Draw 7
16:00

Monday, September 14
Draw 10
12:00

Draw 12
20:00

Tuesday, September 15
Draw 14
12:00

Draw 16
20:00

Wednesday, September 16
Draw 18
12:00

Draw 20
20:00

Thursday, September 17
Draw 22
12:00

Draw 24
20:00

Group D

Saturday, September 12
Draw 2
12:00

Draw 4
20:30

Sunday, September 13
Draw 6
12:00

Draw 8
20:00

Monday, September 14
Draw 10
12:00

Draw 12
20:00

Tuesday, September 15
Draw 13
8:00

Draw 15
16:00

Wednesday, September 16
Draw 17
8:00

Draw 19
16:00

Thursday, September 17
Draw 21
8:00

Draw 23
16:00

Tiebreaker
Friday, September 18, 9:00

Playoffs

Round of 12
Friday, September 18, 14:00

Quarterfinals
Friday, September 18, 20:00

Semifinals
Saturday, September 19, 10:00

Bronze medal game
Saturday, September 19, 15:00

Gold medal game
Saturday, September 19, 15:00

References

External links

World Mixed Curling Championship
2015 in curling
2015 in Swiss sport
International curling competitions hosted by Switzerland
Sport in Bern
International sports competitions hosted by Switzerland